Chief Executive is a business magazine published by Chief Executive Group, LLC.

Description
Chief Executive began publication in 1976. The magazine is published six times a year and has a circulation of 42,000 copies. It is audited twice yearly by BPA Worldwide. The magazine began publishing its magazine online in 1998.

Each May, the magazine publishes its "Best and Worst States for Business" rankings, based on survey results from its CEO readership base. CEOs grade the states on taxes and regulation, the quality of the work force and living environment, among other categories. The 2011 rankings elicited a friendly political feud between Florida Governor Rick Scott and Texas Governor Rick Perry, whose states ranked 3 and 1, respectively.

Chief Executive features a ‘CEO of the Year’ award. Past recipients include: Jack Welch, Bill Gates, Andrew Grove, Lawrence Bossidy, Herb Kelleher, Michael Dell, Fred Smith, A. G. Lafley, Bob Ulrich, Anne Mulcahy, Jim Skinner, Hugh Grant, Alan Mulally, Marillyn Hewson, and Arne Sorenson.

References

External links
Official website

Business magazines published in the United States
News magazines published in the United States
Online magazines published in the United States
Magazines published in Connecticut
Mass media in Stamford, Connecticut
Magazines established in 1976
Magazines disestablished in 1998
Online magazines with defunct print editions